Shuttlewars is a 1981 board game published by Paranoia Press.

Gameplay
Shuttlewars is a tactical game involving orbital space combat taking place in the 1980s.

Reception
William A. Barton reviewed Shuttlewars in The Space Gamer No. 42. Barton commented that "For the price, you can't beat it."

References

Board games introduced in 1981